A Hindu–Muslim clash occurred in Delhi's Jahangirpuri area on 16 April 2022, in the midst of a Hindu procession on the occasion of Hanuman Jayanti. The clash took place during the third procession taken out on that day, which halted near a mosque where Muslims were holding Ramadan prayers.
Stones were pelted and shots were fired in which many were injured including a police officer. Twenty three people were arrested, including two juveniles.

On the 19 April, prompted by a complaint from its state president, the Bharatiya Janata Party that controls the local municipal corporation ordered demolition of the houses, shops and structures on the street where riots took place, claiming them to be illegal encroachments. The Supreme Court of India issued a stay order, but some 20 shops and the front of a mosque were demolished, with the drive continuing for over an hour after being stayed by the Supreme Court.

Background 
Hanuman Jayanti occurs on the full moon day (Poornima) of the Chaitra month of the Hindu calendar (usually occurring in March–April).
It follows Ram Navami, which occurs on the ninth day (Navami) of Chaitra. In the year 2022, both the festivals fell during the Muslim holy month of Ramadan, a form of synchronisation that occurs roughly once in 33 years.
On the day of Ram Navami, huge processions called Shobha Yatras (processions of pomp and glory) were held by the Sangh Parivar organisations around India, and numerous Hindu–Muslim clashes occurred.
The Hindu nationalist Bharatiya Janata Party (BJP) holding power in India has been widely blamed for the religious polarisation that led to the clashes.

Incident 
On 16 April 2022, three processions of Hanuman Jayanti, all called "Shobha Yatras", passed through the Jahangirpuri area. The first two, in the morning and in the afternoon, had due permission from the police and went off without an incident. The third procession in the evening, an unauthorised one, whose organisers have not yet been traced by the police, halted near a mosque on Kushal Road around 6:00 pm, and played loud music while the Muslims were preparing for Iftar.<ref>
Jahangirpuri Violence: Delhi Police Retracts Statement Naming VHP, Bajrang Dal, The Wire, 19 April 2022.
"The Delhi Police registered an FIR on Monday against the organisers of a Hanuman Jayanti procession in Jahangirpuri, for taking out the rally without permission. This was the second case registered regarding Saturday’s violence."
</ref>

According to the local residents, all three processions were organised by Bajrang Dal. They had participants armed with tridents, swords, knives, baseball bats, hockey sticks and a few country-made pistols. They were dancing to loud music (described as "highly objectionable and provocative")
and chanting "Jai Shri Ram".
The Muslims alleged that the processionists tried to enter the Kushal Road mosque, and hoist a saffron flag with "Jai Shri Ram" embossed on it, and that clashes started only after the processionists started to desecrate the mosque.Tarique Anwar, Mukund Jha, Witnesses Narrate How Jahangirpuri Hanuman Jayanti Rally Turned Communal, News Click, 18 Apr 2022.
The Hindu processionists however insisted that the people from inside the mosque and the adjoining Muslim residents attacked them with stones. "They gave us permission and ambushed us", according to a processionist. NewsClick confirmed that the third procession did not follow the prescribed route. It also found saffron flags and stones scattered at the entrance of the mosque. The processionists also claimed that the brandishing of swords and tridents was merely "ceremonial".

Once trouble started, both the groups pelted stones, bricks and beer bottles. A few shots were also fired. Eight police personnel and one civilian were injured according to the police. A sub-inspector received a bullet injury. There were no deaths.

 Investigation 
A First Information Report (FIR) was filed by police inspector Rajiv Ranjan Singh, who was on the spot. It stated that the procession was "peaceful" until it reached the mosque. Violence broke out after a man named Anshar (or Ansar), accompanied by a few others, started arguing with the members of the procession. It said the argument grew into a riotous situation and stone pelting started from both sides. The police managed to separate the two sides, but after a few minutes, stone pelting started again.

Commentators noted that the FIR leaned towards the version of the events offered by "Hindus" (processionists). It did not mention the brandishing of swords or firearms, playing of provocating songs and slogan shouting. It also did not explain why the permissible route was not followed by the procession. There was also no mention of the efforts to hoist a saffron flag on the mosque. The Police Commissioner Rakesh Asthana later dismissed it as a baseless theory.

Early the next day, 14 Muslim men were arrested. The local residents questioned why only Muslims were being arrested when both the sides were involved in fighting. Ansar was named as a conspirator.
His wife, however, claimed that he was called in from home to defuse the situation at the mosque and he later helped police to control the situation. The police state that he had been involved two cases of assault earlier and had been repeatedly arrested under preventive sections. However, the local residents, both Hindu and Muslim, remember him as an extremely helpful person.Laasya Shekhar, Shivangi Saxena, Police ‘abuse’, saffron flags, a mysterious ‘Bangladeshi’ angle: What happened in Jahangirpuri?, Newslaundry, 18 April 2022.

Another man named Mohammad Aslam was alleged to have shot a pistol, with the  bullet hitting a police sub-inspector. The pistol used in the shooting was recovered by the police. 

Yunus Imam alias Sonu Chikna was also arrested after a video was circulated on social media on 17 April showing him firing a pistol during the riots.  The police personnel who had gone to arrest him were initially attacked by his family members who pelted stones at the police, according to a spokesperson, who added that one person had been detained and the situation brought under control. 

Sheikh Hameed, a scrap dealer, was arrested for supplying glass bottle to be used as missiles. On 18 April, Forensic teams collected samples, took photographs and collected CCTV footage of the riot scene.

Delhi police initially linked Vishva Hindu Parishad (VHP) and Bajrang Dal for taking out a procession without permission but later retracted the names of the organisations, just stating that the procession was taken out without seeking permission.

On 19 April, National Security Act (NSA) was invoked upon 5 people accused of being the conspirators of this riot. On the same day, police arrested Ghulam Rasool alias Gulli for supplying the pistol used during the riot.

The police also released CCTV footage from 2:00 am on 15 April, where several men are seen collecting sticks and rods. The locals are seen to be objecting to the activity. Finally, one of the locals threatened them by grabbing a stick and a minor clash erupted. The police have been led consider the possibility of the clash being planned in advance.

On 23 April, Enforcement Directorate (ED) filed a money laundering case against Ansar, who is said to have an affluent home at Haldia in West Bengal.

 Demolitions 
The BJP-controlled North Delhi Municipal Corporation, acting on a complaint by its state party president, issued a late-night order on 19 April 2022, to demolish houses and shops on the street where the riot had occurred, claiming them to be encroachments into public areas.
Nine bulldozers rolled into the area by 9:30 am the next day, along with 14 civic teams and 1,500 police personnel, many in riot gear.

This pattern had already occurred in many states during the month of April.Gerry Shih, Anant Guta, Religious clashes across India spark fears of further violence, The Washington Post, 20 April 2022.  'While the country, which has a nearly 80 percent Hindu majority and 14 percent Muslim minority, has experienced far bloodier spasms of religious violence in its history, the scope and intensity of the clashes this month have alarmed observers.'
Demolition drives had been carried out following communal clashes in the states of Madhya Pradesh, Gujarat and Uttarakhand, all ruled by BJP governments, targeting "one community" (Muslims). A BJP leader revealed to The Indian Express that the Delhi BJP leadership wanted the Yogi Adityanath's model (from Uttar Pradesh)
in Delhi, and the central BJP leadership took the decision to go ahead with it.

A petitioner rushed to the Supreme Court of India to stop the demolition.  A three judge bench headed by the Chief Justice N. V. Ramana heard the petition. The petitioner's counsel argued:

The Chief Justice ordered maintenance of the status quo'' until the next hearing. 
But the demolitions did not stop. Officials said that they did not have the court order in hand yet and continued with the demolition. Another hearing and another order to halt the demolition "immediately" were necessary. CPI(M)'s Brinda Karat took a copy of the order, rushed to the demolition site, and stood in front of a bulldozer, asking them to stop.

By this time, some 20 shops were bulldozed as well as the front of the mosque, from where the attacks allegedly took place during the riot. The Hindu temple on the same street was not touched.
The officials claimed that they had received the Supreme Court order before they could get to it, though the residents contest this claim.
Later, Hindus in the area voluntarily removed the encroached area of the temple.

Notes

References

Religiously motivated violence in India
Riots